Ağzıbir or Agzibir may refer to:
Ağzıbir, Agdash
Agzibir, Kalbajar